Daniel Bernard Weisweiller (1814 – 13 January 1892) was a German-born Spanish banker of Jewish descent. He was an agent of Rothschild banking house in Madrid, taking over from Lionel de Rothschild in 1834. According to Niall Ferguson, Weisweiller was "the most important Rothschild agent in the 1830s."

Weisweiller married Adeline Helbert in 1843. The couple had one daughter, Adela Weisweiller (1845–1925) who married , the mayor of Cannes (1902–1928).

References 

1814 births
1892 deaths
Spanish bankers
Spanish people of German-Jewish descent
19th-century Spanish businesspeople
Businesspeople from Frankfurt